The Association for the Advancement of Medical Instrumentation (AAMI) is an organization for advancing the development, and safe and effective use of medical technology founded in 1965 by Robert D. Hall Jr.  and Robert J. Allen, President and Vice President respectively of Tech/Reps, Inc. (a medical Instrumentation marketing firm in Needham, Massachusetts). AAMI was created by the Tech/Reps' team as both a vehicle to help their clients introduce innovative medical devices into common medical practice and to set safety standards in both their design and usage.  Dr. John Merrill of Peter Bent Brigham Hospital, and John Abele, Sales Manager of Advanced Instruments, Inc. joined with Hall and Allen to establish AAMI. Among the first members were Doctors Paul Dudley White, Michael Debakey, Adrian Kantrowitz, and the US Surgeon General. AAMI members now include decision makers in the medical technology profession—clinical engineers, biomedical equipment technicians, manufacturers, sterile processing professionals, researchers, quality assurance and regulatory affairs experts, and other healthcare technology management professionals. In 1966, AAMI was introduced to the  public at large through MEDAC 66 (Medical Equipment Display and Conference) held in Boston at which Drs. Debakey and Kantrowitz introduced the world's first artificial hearts and debated the merits of each.

More than 7,000 individuals, hospitals, and medical device manufacturers are members of AAMI.

Focus 
Committees of manufacturers, healthcare professionals, regulators, scientists, academics, and other interested parties research and develop new or revise existing recommended practices and standards that address the use, care, and processing of performance requirements to be met by medical devices and technology.

AAMI is a voluntary organization, and although its recommended practices and standards sometimes echo other healthcare guidelines, compliance with these standards is not necessarily required by regulatory organizations that inspect healthcare facilities.

Events Held by AAMI 

 AAMI Annual Conference & Expo
 AAMI Standards Week
 AAMI/FDA International Conference on Medical Device Standards and Regulation

References

External links 

Medical and health organizations based in Virginia